Trimurti is a 1974 Hindi movie. Produced and directed by Rajendra Bhatia. The film stars Sanjay Khan, Parveen Babi, Rakesh Roshan and Asrani. The film's music is by R. D. Burman.

Synopsis
Vijay, Nandu, and Bhola are unemployed and lives in a small town with their mother Kalyani. Nandu is a big trouble maker. One day Jagannath is murdered in his own house. Nandu is deemed the prime suspect for the murder. Police picks up the case and soon finds evidence that makes it more difficult to determine who exactly is responsible for Jagannath's death..

Cast
Sanjay Khan as Vijay
Parveen Babi as Sunita
Rakesh Roshan as Nandu
Asrani as Bhola
Bipin Gupta as Swami Ji
A. K. Hangal as Jagannath 
I. S. Johar as Shadilal
Arvind Trivedi as Balraam (Jagannath's Brother)
Keshto Mukherjee as Bewda
Achala Sachdev as Kalyani

Music

Track listing

External links

References

 http://www.gomolo.com/trimurti-movie/4625
 https://www.cinestaan.com/movies/trimurti-4301
 http://ibosnetwork.com/asp/filmbodetails.asp?id=Trimurti+%281974%29

1974 films
1970s Hindi-language films
Films scored by R. D. Burman